Haplostethops is a genus of flower weevils in the beetle family Curculionidae. There are about eight described species in Haplostethops. The genus name is masculine, contrary to some sources, following ICZN Article 30.1.4.3: "A compound genus-group name ending in -ops is to be treated as masculine, regardless of its derivation or of its treatment by its author."

Species
These eight species belong to the genus Haplostethops:
 Haplostethops caviventris Blatchley, 1922
 Haplostethops ellipsoideus (Casey, 1892)
 Haplostethops elongatus Casey, 1920
 Haplostethops fusiformis Casey, 1920
 Haplostethops gravidulus Casey, 1920
 Haplostethops marginatus Casey, 1920
 Haplostethops scaphinellus Casey, 1920

References

Further reading

 
 
 

Baridinae
Articles created by Qbugbot